Bhangra Paa Le is a 2020 Indian Hindi-language comedy-drama film, directed by debutant Sneha Taurani and produced by Ronnie Screwvala. It stars Sunny Kaushal and Rukshar Dhillon. Initially planned to release on 13 September 2019 and then 1 November 2019, it was theatrically released in India on 3 January 2020.

Plot 

Set in Amritsar, the movie narrates the story of two generations.

Kaptaan, the grandfather of the protagonist Jaggi Singh, is a former army soldier whose passion is Bhangra. He continues to perform Bhangra after being recruited in the army. On the battlefield as well, he motivates his comrades to get up by beating a drum and performing Bhangra. Unfortunately, Kaptaan loses a leg in the war, and feels dejected and refuses to go home. Back home, Nimmo, the girl he loves, is about to get married.

Kaptaan had met Nimmo at a neighbouring wedding and wooed her family by performing Bhangra in the duel. Her brothers order Kaptaan to come ask for Nimmo's hand after the war, but as he fails to come, they arrange her alliance elsewhere.

In the camp, Kaptaan's comrades cheer him up by beating the drum, and motivate him to return home. He goes to Nimmo's house in the middle of her wedding preparations, and dances on one leg to woo her family again. Nimmo enters with the drum and provides him with support, and the family agrees to their wedding.

In the present, Jaggi Singh is a Bhangra aspirant from Khalsa college who wants Bhangra to make it big in the world. Kaptaan is Jaggi's idol, and he believes that in order to perform the main move in Bhangra, the "jhoomar", one has to be in love. He meets Simi Kohli in a wedding and they immediately hit it off. Later, they find out they are from rival colleges Khalsa and GNDU, in the international Bhangra competition, and part ways. Both teams get through the semi finals, and Jaggi and Simi come closer. Simi falls in love, and dances her heart out in the qualifier round, which leads to GNDU winning the ticket to the finals in London. The qualifier round results lead to a crowd clash between the two teams, and Jaggi gets injured in the leg while trying to break off the fights. Upset, Jaggi then ignores Simi, breaks it off with his team, and returns to his village, where he eventually reunites with the village Bhangra group, Pendu Club, run by his father.

Pendu Club starts making dance videos and enters the competition in London through crowdfunding.
Both GNDU and Pendu Club are able to clear the semi final rounds. Jaggi and Simi meet again, and spend time together near the London Eye. He tells her about Kaptaan and Nimmo, and she tells him about her father who had abandoned her, who she recently met in London. They grow closer.
Later, in the final round, Jaggi finds his leg collapsing. Simi enters in the wings with a drum, motivating Jaggi to keep dancing. He also performs "jhoomar" with the same energy now, and Pendu Club wins the competition. Simi and Jaggi finally unite as lovers.

Cast 
 Sunny Kaushal as Jaggi and Kaptaan Singh
 Rukshar Dhillon as Simi Kohli
 Shriya Pilgaonkar as Nimmo
 Swasti Kapur as Kiran
 Sarthak Kakar as Pappi
 Parmeet Sethi as Jaggi's father
 Jayati Bhatia as Jaggi's mother
 Samir Soni as Simi's father
 Sheeba Chaddha as Simi's mother
 Mahavir Bhullar as Kaptaan's father
 Seema Kaushal as Kaptaan's mother
 Kamlesh Gill as Nimmo's grandmother
 Naila Grewal as Heer
 Varun Narang as Bhangra competition judge
 Mark Bennington as Henderson

Production 
Ronnie Screwvala, launching  debutante Sneha Taurani as director, planned this music and dance film. Bhangra Paa Le is set to be a bridge between the traditional forms of 
Bhangra from Punjab and western dance forms from all across the world. Launching Sunny Kaushal, Rukshar Dhillon was cast opposite him. The filming began in January 2019.

Release
The film was scheduled to be released theatrically on 1 November 2019, but got delayed, and finally released in India on 3 January 2020. The film was later released on Netflix on 1 March 2020.

Soundtrack

The music of the film is composed by Shubham Shirule, Keeran, 
Aakashdeep Sengupta, Kaushik - Aakash - Guddu (KAG), Ana Rehman, Nilotpal Munshi, Kiranee for JAM8, Rishi Rich, Yash Narvekar and A Bazz with lyrics written by Shloke Lal, Kiranee, Shubham Shirule for JAM8, Siddhant Kaushal, Mandy Gill, Raftaar, Yash Narvekar, Manisha and A Bazz. The song "Bhangra Paa Le" is a remake of the song "Bhangra Paale" from the film Karan Arjun.

References

External links 
 
 
 

2020 films
2020s Hindi-language films
Films scored by JAM8
Films scored by Rishi Rich
Films scored by Yash Narvekar
2020s musical comedy-drama films
Indian musical comedy-drama films
Indian dance films
Indian Army in films
Films set in Punjab, India
Films set in Amritsar
Films set in London
2020 comedy-drama films